This article refers to sports broadcasting contracts in Belarus. For a list of rights in other countries, see Sports television broadcast contracts.

Multi-discipline events 
 Summer Olympic Games: Belarus 1, Belarus 2, Belarus 5
 Winter Olympic Games: Belarus 1, Belarus 2, Belarus 5
 European Games: Belarus 5
 Summer Universiade: Eurosport
 Winter Universiade: Eurosport

Football 
 FIFA World Cup: FIFA TV
 Premier League: Setanta Sports
 Bundesliga: Setanta Sports
 La Liga: Setanta Sports, Belarus 5
 Segunda División: Setantasports.com
 Serie A: Setanta Sports
 Ligue 1: Setanta Sports
 Eredivisie: Setanta Sports, Setantasports.com 
 Jupiler Pro League: Setantasports.com
 Scottish Premier League: Setantasports.com
 EFL Cup: Setanta Sports
 Sky Bet Championship: Setanta Sports, Football TV
 Russian Premier League: Yasnae TV , Belarus 5, Voka TV
 Belarusian Premier League: Belarus 5
 Belarusian Cup: Belarus 5
 Belarusian Super Cup: Belarus 5
 Allsvenskan: Eurosport Player
 Eliteserien: Eurosport

Ice hockey 
 IIHF World Championships: Belarus 5
 IIHF World U20 Championship: Belarus 5
 Euro Hockey Challenge: Belarus 5
 NHL: Setanta Sports
 AHL: Viasat Sport
  SHL: Viasat Sport
 KHL: Belarus 5, KHL TV
 MHL: KHL TV
 Hockey Champion's League: Belarus 5
 Belarusian Extraleague: Belarus 5
 Belarusian Cup: Belarus 5

Basketball 
 FIBA Women's Basketball World Cup: Belarus 5
 FIBA EuroBasket Women: Belarus 5
 NBA: Setanta Sports
 NCAA basketball: Viasat Sport
 VTB United League: Belarus 5
 Euroleague: Setanta Sports

Volleyball 
 Men's European Volleyball Championship: Belarus 5
 Women's European Volleyball Championship: Belarus 5
 Volleyball Euroleague: Belarus 5
 CEV Cup: Belarus 5
 CEV Challenge Cup:

Handball 
 IHF World Men's Handball Championship: Belarus 5
 European handball championship men: Belarus 5
 Belarus men's national handball team: Belarus 5
 EHF Champions League: Belarus 5
 SEHA League: Belarus 5
 Belarusian Handball League: Belarus 5

Biathlon 
 Biathlon World Championships: Belarus 2, Belarus 5, Eurosport
 Biathlon World Cup: Belarus 2, Belarus 5, Eurosport
 Biathlon Junior World Championships: Belarus 5, Eurosport
 Biathlon European Championships: Eurosport

Tennis 
 Australian Open: Eurosport
 French Open: Eurosport
 US Open: Eurosport
 ATP World Tour: Setanta Sports

Athletics 
 IAAF World Championships: Belarus 5, Eurosport
 IAAF World Junior Championships in Athletics: Belarus 5, Eurosport
 IAAF World Indoor Championships in Athletics: Belarus 5, Eurosport
 IAAF World Challenge: Belarus 5
 European Athletics Championships: Belarus 5, Eurosport

Swimming 
 FINA World Aquatics Championships: Belarus 5, Eurosport
 FINA World Swimming Championships (25 m): Belarus 5
 European Swimming Championships: Eurosport

Canoeing 
 World Canoeing Championship: Belarus 5, Eurosport
 World Canoeing Cup: Eurosport
 European Canoeing Championships: Eurosport

Motorsport 
 Formula One: Setanta Sports
 Formula E: Eurosport, Setanta Sports
 WTCR: Eurosport
 Pure ETCR Championship: Eurosport
 GT World Challenge Europe Endurance Cup: Motorsport.tv
 WEC: Eurosport, Motorsport.tv
 Dakar Rally: Eurosport
 European Rally Championship: Eurosport
 World Superbike: Eurosport
 FIM Motocross World Championship: Eurosport
  FIM EWC: Eurosport
 NASCAR: Setanta Sports
 Russian Touring Car Championship:Match TV Planeta

Cycling 
 UCI World Championships: Eurosport
 Giro d'Italia: Eurosport
 Tour de France: Eurosport
 Vuelta a España: Eurosport
 UCI World Tour: Eurosport

Boxing 
Dream Boxing: DAZN: October 2022 to October 2025, all fights

Kickboxing 
 King of Kings: DAZN: October 2022 to October 2025, all fights

MMA 
 Bellator: Setanta Sports
 Bushido MMA: DAZN: October 2022 to October 2025, all fights
 UFC: Setanta Sports

Skiing 
 World ski championships: Eurosport
 World Alpine Ski Championships: Eurosport
 FIS World Cup: Eurosport

Rowing 
 World Rowing Championships: Eurosport
 Rowing World Cup: Eurosport
 European Rowing Championships: Eurosport

Gymnastics 
 World Artistic Gymnastics Championships: Belarus 5
 Artistic Gymnastics World Cup: Belarus 5
 World Rhythmic Gymnastics Championships: Belarus 5

Weightlifting 
 World Weightlifting Championships: Eurosport
 European Weightlifting Championships: Eurosport

Fencing 
 World Fencing Championships: Eurosport
 European Fencing Championships: Eurosport

Table tennis 
 World Table Tennis Championships: Eurosport
 ITTF World Tour: Eurosport

Beach soccer 
 FIFA Beach Soccer World Cup: Belarus 5
 Euro Beach Soccer League: Belarus 5

American football 
 NCAA football: Viasat Sport
 NFL: Viasat Sport

Baseball 
 Major League Baseball: Viasat Sport

Australian rules football 
 Australian Football League: Viasat Sport

Curling 
 World Curling Championships: Eurosport
 European Curling Championships: Eurosport

Golf 
 PGA Tour: Eurosport

Belarus
Television in Belarus